"Living in a Ghost Town" is a song by English rock band the Rolling Stones. The song was recorded during sessions of the Rolling Stones in 2019, ultimately being finished the following year. The track is reggae-influenced and features lyrics and a music video that reference the COVID-19 pandemic. It was released as a digital download and streaming single on 23 April 2020, through Polydor Records. The song was the Rolling Stones' first single in four years and the first original material from the band since "Doom and Gloom" and "One More Shot" in 2012. It received generally positive reviews from music critics and was a commercial success, appearing on over a dozen sales and streaming charts. It is the final original recording by the band to feature Charlie Watts before his death in August 2021.

Recording and composition
Since 2017, the Rolling Stones had been on the No Filter Tour but had to stop touring in 2020 due to the COVID-19 pandemic. The Rolling Stones remotely performed at Global Citizen's Together at Home concert on 18 April 2020, helping raise money for healthcare workers and the World Health Organization during the crisis. On 23April, the band released "Living in a Ghost Town" online as a single. It was based on 2019 recording sessions and finished remotely, making this their first original material since 2012 and their first release since the 2016 cover album Blue & Lonesome. Vocalist Mick Jagger claims to have written the lyrics in 10minutes. The band fast-tracked releasing the song due to its relevance to social distancing, which has been used as a method to control the spread of COVID-19. While the original narrative of the song was about being a ghost after a plague, Jagger changed some of the lyrics to refer to the pandemic.

Nidhi Gupta of GQ India labeled "Living in a Ghost Town" as a "gentle blues-rock number". Multiple writers noticed a reggae influence in the song: Will Hodgkinson of The Irish Times described the song as "a slow-paced chug with a tint of reggae", while Alexis Petridis from The Guardian noted a "vintage reggae flavour" in the song's "stabbing, echoing organ", and Louder Sounds Fraser Lewry calling it "a relaxed piece of reggae-infused rock".

After the single's release, the Rolling Stones collaborated with Brazilian disc jockey Alok to create a remix to which, in the view of Rolling Stones Daniel Kreps,  "Alok applied a buoyant dance-music sheen and propulsive beat [...] while still preserving the track's more spectral elements."

Release and reception
The song was initially released for digital download and streaming as a single on 23 April 2020, being accompanied by a music video with footage of empty city streets that was taken from across the world. Once the pandemic subsides, the Rolling Stones plan to resume the No Filter Tour and releasing the single is a means of keeping fans happy who cannot see them live, as well as for promotion of their upcoming album. A CD single and purple vinyl, both of which are exclusive to the band's online store, and an orange vinyl for sale by other retailers were later released.

Writing in The Guardian, Alexis Petridis awarded the song four out of five stars, calling it the Rolling Stones' "best new song in years", with particular emphasis on the timely lyrics and reggae influence to the music. Writing for The Irish Times, Will Hodginkson gave the same score and agreed that the song's pacing and mood captures the experience of being in lockdown during the pandemic. Craig Jenkins of Vulture opined that the single arrives "right on time" as the "track lands in the sweet spot between wistful boomer nostalgia and tacit acknowledgment that the sands of time have shifted, and once again we’re looking fondly backward instead of excitedly forward". Mark Beaumont of NME panned the track, calling it a "a rushed and half-baked comment on our current predicament", particularly criticizing the lyrics, as "Jagger perhaps doesn't have it in him to speak to the real discomfort and isolation of the average British hutch dweller, or the fear and hopelessness of the millions falling unfairly through the gaping holes in Rishi Sunak's fishnet safety packages". The New York Times prepares a regular list of the most notable music releases of the week, and Jon Pareles recommended the track. For Stereogum, Tom Breihan briefly commented on the track and the band's relevance, writing that it was highly produced but "rocks harder than you might expect a new Stones song to rock".

On 3July 2020, "Living in a Ghost Town" topped the German singles chart, after several different special editions were released for the song, making the Rolling Stones the oldest artists ever to reach number one on the chart and giving them the longest-running gap between two number-one singles in Germany, following on from "Jumpin' Jack Flash" reaching number one in 1968. Streaming numbers were not higher than they had been for the previous few weeks due to the placement in for the German Charts being purely sales-dependent; it does does not depend on the number of streams.

Personnel
Credits sources from single liner notes

The Rolling Stones
Mick Jagger – vocals, guitar, harmonica, production (as a member of the Glimmer Twins)
Keith Richards – guitar, backing vocals, production (as a member of the Glimmer Twins)
Charlie Watts – drums
Ronnie Wood – lead guitar, backing vocals

Additional personnel
Matt Clifford – keyboards, French horn, flugelhorn, saxophone, engineering
Darryl Jones – bass guitar
Krish Sharma – engineering
Cenzo Townshend – mixing
Don Was – production

Charts

Release history

See also
 "Ghost Town", a 1981 Specials single
 "Murder Most Foul", a 2020 Bob Dylan single that has been compared to this song

References

External links

Reviews at Album of the Year

"Living in a Ghost Town" at Rate Your Music
Review of the song at MSN.com

2020 singles
2020 songs
Number-one singles in Germany
Reggae rock songs
The Rolling Stones songs
Song recordings produced by Don Was
Song recordings produced by Jagger–Richards
Songs written by Jagger–Richards
Polydor Records singles
Songs about the COVID-19 pandemic
British reggae songs